Loudmouth Golf is an American sportswear company based in Sonoma County, California known for colorful  trousers.

The company was established in 2000 by Scott "Woody" Woodworth, then a graphic designer.  His first design involved a children's fabric with prints of Warner Brothers cartoon characters, which he had made by a local seamstress.  The designs caught the attention of various sports personalities, who began ordering the pants.  In 2007 Woodworth began creating his own fabric designs.

In 2009 golfer John Daly appeared wearing "loud" clothing from the company on the European Tour while banned from the PGA Tour.  Daly later entered a formal endorsement agreement with the company. 

The Norwegian curling team drew international attention to the company, and to themselves, at the 2010 Winter Olympics by wearing Loudmouth's "Dixie-A" pants with red, white, and blue diamonds as a uniform.  The team wore the pants on advice from second Chris Svae who served as their fashion consultant.  The team gave a pair to King Harald V of Norway. A Facebook fan page created for Norway's pants drew more than 500,000 fans during the games.  During the Olympics, Loudmouth's web traffic increased by a factor of ten and sales tripled.

References

External links
loudmouthgolf.com - official site

Sportswear brands
Sporting goods manufacturers of the United States
Clothing companies established in 2000
Golf equipment manufacturers